In petroleum engineering, the Leverett J-function is a dimensionless function of water saturation describing the capillary pressure, 

The function is important in that it is constant for a given saturation within a reservoir, thus relating reservoir properties for neighboring beds.

The Leverett J-function is an attempt at extrapolating capillary pressure data for a given rock to rocks that are similar but with differing permeability, porosity and wetting properties. It assumes that the porous rock can be modelled as a bundle of non-connecting capillary tubes, where the factor  is a characteristic length of the capillaries' radii.

This function is also widely used in modeling two-phase flow of proton-exchange membrane fuel cells. A large degree of hydration is needed for good proton conductivity while large liquid water saturation in pores of catalyst layer or diffusion media will impede gas transport in the cathode.

J-function in analyzing capillary pressure data is analogous with TEM-function in analyzing relative permeability data.

See also
 Amott test
 TEM-function

References

External links
 http://www.ux.uis.no/~s-skj/ResTek1-v03/Notater/Tamu.Lecture.Notes/Capillary.Pressure/Lecture_16.ppt
 http://perminc.com/resources/fundamentals-of-fluid-flow-in-porous-media/chapter-2-the-porous-medium/multi-phase-saturated-rock-properties/averaging-capillary-pressure-data-leverett-j-function/
 Leverett J-Function in Multiphase Saturated Rocks

Petroleum engineering